Seva Bharati (Hindi: सेवा भारती) is a non-governmental organization (NGO) working among the economically weaker sections of Indian society, including tribal (vanvasi communities). It also works among urban slum dwellers and resettlement colonies by introducing welfare and social service programs, such as free medical assistance, free education, and vocational training.

History 
On 8 April 1979 veteran social worker and the then RSS Sarsanghachalak Shri Balasaheb Deoras addressed a mammoth gathering of volunteers at Ambedkar Stadium, Delhi, where he called upon them to start service activities among the neglected sections of the society. He asked the volunteers to raise self-respect of the socially and economically deprived people of India. This speech is considered to be the initiating first step that led to starting the Seva Bharati. Although the volunteers of RSS and other allied organisations had been informally working for the betterment of the under-privileged, it was opined that a formal structure would help coordinate the service programs all over the country. Seva Bharati was thus established later that year.

Organisation 
Seva Bharati is inspired from the Rashtriya Swayamsevak Sangh (RSS) and is the official community service umbrella of allied organisations. The Akhil Bharatiya Saha Seva Pramukh of the RSS guides the organisation and is also represented in the Akhil Bharatiya Pratinidhi Sabha, the highest decision making body of the Sangh Parivar.

Akhila Bharatiya Seva Pramukhs
 Shri Yadavrao Joshi (1989–1991)

 Shri K. Suryananarayan Rao (1991–1999)

 Shri Bhaiyyaji Joshi(1999–2004)

 Shri Premchand Goel (2003–2007)

 Shri Sitaram Kedilaya (2007–2012)

 Shri Suhasrao Hiremath  (2012–2015)

 Shri Ajit Mahapatra(2015-2017)

 Shri  Parag Abhyankar (2017- )

Activities 
The massive relief work carried out by Seva Bharati following the 2001 Gujarat earthquake, the 2008 Bihar flood 2004 Indian Ocean earthquake and tsunami  and the Kerala Flood 1st and 2nd came in for considerable appreciation from various quarters. The organisation is also known for its efforts in rehabilitating the victims of terror, especially the children who are rendered orphans by terror attacks.

The volunteers of Seva Bharati today are involved in more than one hundred thousand service projects in remote areas of the country. Volunteers have been the first to reach many natural calamities, be it floods, accidents or other natural calamities such as earthquake or tsunami. Seva Bharati is reported to have 17.500 projects in education, 12,000 in health care, 26,000 in social welfare and 9238 self-reliance projects. These projects, serving the economically weaker and socially neglected sections of the society range from medical assistance, crèche, library, hostel, basic education, adult education, vocational and industrial training, upliftment of street children and the lepers. Through these projects Seva Bharti aims at making the underprivileged sections of the society self-reliant in all aspects of their lives.

Health

The Seva Bharati organizational report states that it has over five thousand health care centers spread across India, including 4200 rural health care centers, 960 mobile clinics, 480 resident clinics in urban areas, 200 counseling centers,, 6500 ambulances and 7 leprosy medication and rehabilitation centers. It has a chain of 450 Blood banks and over three hundred blood donation indexes that serve in times of emergencies. Seva Bharati helps poor patients get medicine for free or for subsidized amounts. It is reported that although the organization runs on "shoestring budget", it has been considered a "savior for those desperately in need of un-affordable medicines". It is reported that there are 234 such medicine collection and redistribution centers across India.

It has partnered with premier technological institutions to upgrade the health infrastructure. In a project partnered with the Birla Institute of Technology, Pilani, telemedicine centers have been formed with the aim of delivering of health care services across distances using telecom technology. Using the software 'Remedy Kit' and internet technology, developed by the institute, vital information regarding pulse rate, heartbeat, blood pressure, ECG can be transferred over the broadband link from Seva Bharti to Medical Center, BITS-Pilani. The health care personnel at Medical Center will analyze and diagnose the health condition and prescribe the medicines that will be available at Seva Bharti Complex. The entire procedure will take merely 3–5 minutes. These techniques will be beneficial towards improvisation of health care accessibility, immunization drives, educating young mothers and children about hygiene and general cleanliness.
Free health care camps are organized in the slums and economically poor areas with the help of hospitals, where hundreds of patients among other checkups are examined for cardiac and diabetic ailments. In the camps, teams of technicians, conduct free ECG, Echo cardiography and blood sugar testing. Apart from the checkups, there are dietitians who advise the patients about healthy diet, exercises and medicines. Medicines are distributed free of cost and counseling on psychiatric ailments is also provided. It also organizes naturopathy and other wellness camps for general public and thousands of people have benefited from these camps.

AIDS awareness
Seva Bharati also conducts AIDS awareness programmes targeting lorry drivers, taxi drivers, dhaba owners and the youth where hundreds of participants participate and discuss topics including "General health and hygiene", "STD symptoms and mode of transmission", "HIV-AIDS symptoms and mode of transmission" and "Safe sex". Exhibitions are also organized and literature is distributed to make people aware about the disease and its prevention. Besides this, the organization regularly has health awareness drives like the ones on the world heart day.

During swine flu epidemic
The volunteers of the RSS, coordinated with the officials of various organizations, including the National Institute of Virology (NIV), the Pune Municipal Corporation (PMC), the Indian Medical Association and held awareness campaign against swine flu. The volunteers helped the governmental authorities and people in tackling flu.

The team of RSS workers, which included medical professionals, helped the people at the screening centers. They provided leaflets to various housing societies and hoped to reach out to up to 1,000 societies in this way.

Empowerment of differently abled children
Seva Bharati has many schools, rehabilitation and recreation centers for differently abled and special needs children and adult. The organization reports that it has 179 such centers across India, including special schools, hostels and recreation centers.
It also organizes awareness drives about the needs of the special needs children. Special meetings for disabled persons held by the organization serve as a platform for them to interact with specialists and others associated with them. Pediatricians, gynecologists, audiologists, ophthalmologists and other specialists participate in such camps.

Activities for visually impaired
Seva Bharati and allied organizations have many eye banks that regularly conduct eye donation camps. They have provided hundreds of blind persons with eyes. The organization in collaboration with other eye hospitals runs eye care initiatives for the urban poor. The initiatives have covered thousands of slum children and aim at eradicating blindness and eye diseases in children. In one of the initiatives to provide free pediatric eye care to slum children, held in association with the Narayana Nethralaya in Bangalore, over 1010 slum children were screened. 200 children were detected to have visual problems and some of the conditions detected were corneal problems (18), squint (11), retinal (09), eyelid problems (16) and cataract (03). All these children requiring surgery & treatment received the same free of cost at Narayana Nethralaya over 143 received spectacles and other treatment free of cost. The project has put a target of screening 10,000 slum children before the end of 2009. In the last two camps, a team of doctors, paramedical workers, and volunteers from NGOs examined and treated over 2400 children and even operated those requiring surgery – free of cost. Camps are also held in which corneal plantation is performed on hundreds of patients, which cure the eye ailments and help them regain their eyesight.

Rehabilitating lepers
Seva Bharati has rehabilitation centers for lepers. One such center is near Rajamundry in Andhra Pradesh. The center was founded in 1975 by Colonel D.S. Raju who had been a personal doctor to Netaji Subhash Chandra Bose in INA. In 1982, it was handed over to the RSS and since then has been managed by RSS and Seva Bharati volunteers. It houses 106 leprosy patients and has a hospital adjoining the centre that caters to their medication needs. The  is surrounded by greenery and also maintains a 'gosala' and a library. The yeomen service rendered by the organisation has found mention in the case study in rehabilitation of leprosy patients authored by Dr A P J Abdul Kalam, the former President of India.

Education
Seva Bharati has numerous hostels for the economically underprivileged children across the country, especially the tribal and the rural poor. The organization reports over ten thousand educational projects in India, including hostels for boys and girls, primary education centers in rural areas and in slums, adult and informal education centers for street children and single teacher schools in the remote places of the country. It also helps students from the remote tribal areas to enroll in schools in different parts of the country and sponsors all their educational and other needs. It conducts camps for children that teach them folk songs and dances, making arts and crafts and painting to encourage creativity among them.

The organisation has run many literacy initiatives for adults and children. A project in the slums of Delhi aims at making Delhi hundred percent literate.

Orphanages
Seva Bharati has rehabilitation centres named "Matri Chhaya" or (Mother's care) for destitute children. The project plans to envisage the "Matri Chaya" to be different from an orphanage and aims to provide ll facilities for children abandoned by their parents.. It is intended to provide the 'adopted' children education and other facilities till they settle in their life. "The aim of this project" as explained by one of its volunteers "is to facilitate a good, healthy life for those children who are generally termed 'unwanted'". Seva Bharati ties up with all the hospitals and the police to get information about all such children who are abandoned after their birth by their parents. These children are sent to schools and thereafter, to the vocational centers run by the organization, education for these children also includes coaching for higher studies after they clear their secondary level education.

Empowerment of women

Seva Bharati has large number of centers that provide vocational training to economically underprivileged women. It trains women in making handicrafts and decorative items and helps to market these products. Hundreds of girls trained by Seva Bharati over the years are transforming handicrafts into a successful cottage industry mostly in the North Eastern states of India. Seva Bharati also conducts camps and organises exhibitions of handicrafts churned out at such camps and works as a catalyst in marketing these items. The participants are usually trained in fabric painting, hand stitching, pot-painting, glass painting, jute work, flower-making, cane and bamboo craft, pith and banana fibre craft. As volunteer notes, the best part is that the items produced by these women are in demand because of their quality and hence are getting bulk orders. The handicrafts are today finding their way into homes across India.

Seva Bharati reports that it has a total of 1404 such training projects across India, including centers that teach computers, tailoring, shorthand, stitching, sweater making, typing, carpentry, nursing, arts and handicrafts and recreational activities These training programs help the participants find jobs and earn a livelihood.

Seva Bharati also has many initiatives aimed at creating awareness among women regarding socio-economic programmes and health. The programmes create awareness about minor ailments, health, hygiene and nutrition, environment, pregnancy and rights of women, besides prevention of addiction.

Human rights campaign
From the Valley of Kashmir to the Hills of the North-eastern India Seva Bharati works tirelessly for the basic human rights. The campaign for the Kashmiri Pandits or the campaign for the Pardhees of Maharashtra (labeled at birth as criminal tribe) or the Chenchu tribals of Nallamala Andhra Pradesh or the Gonds of Madhya Pradesh and Chhattisgarh the campaign for a better life and rights continues.

Pardhees are one of the 150 communities that the British notified as criminals in 1871. Though the Indian republic denotified them in 1952, 60 million of them continue to be social outcasts and victims at the hands of the police. Phase Pardhis form one third of the Pardhee clan). Under the banner of Bhatke Vimukta Vikas pratishtan and the Yamgarwadi Mitra Mandal fight for the rights and betterment of Pardhis continues. The rehabilitation of the Pardhis and the fight has brought eminent social worker Girish Prabhune several laurels in the field.

Seva Bharati has stood by the Assam violence victims of July 2012. The Volunteers have set up medical aid, food and shelters to the victims . The activities extended to 60,000 victims providing food and shelter. Medical aid was provided with the help of 3 mobile dispensaries and 4 teams of doctors. Two truck loads of utensils were provided to the victims.

Fighting for the rights of underprivileged women
Seva Bharati is also known for fighting for the rights of women who are taken as domestic help to the cities and are exploited and abused. It has taken up issues such as wage deprivation, assault, and abuse and has also represented their concerns to various governmental bodies. It has coordinated with the governmental agencies to save rescue girls from abuse and harassment.

Relief and rehabilitation during natural calamities

Following the 2001 Gujarat Earthquake
As many as 25,000 volunteers, including 600 doctors, from Seva Bharati, worked to rescue and rehabilitate the victims of the 2001 Gujarat earthquake. Nearly 10,000 operations were performed and over 19,000 patients were treated of injuries and other ailments. Besides, the organisation sent huge amounts of relief material for the quake-hit victims from different parts of the country.

News magazine Outlook reported "Literally within minutes RSS / Seva Bharati volunteers were at the scenes of distress. Across Gujarat, the (RSS) cadres were the saviours. Even as the state machinery went comatose in the first two days after the quake, the cadre-based machinery of the Sangh fanned out throughout the state. Approximately 35,000 RSS members in uniform were pressed into service."

In the words of the district collector of Ahmedabad K. Srinivas: "This is an old tradition in the RSS. To be the first at any disaster strike: floods, cyclone, drought and now quake. In Kachchh, too, the RSS / Seva Bharati was the first to reach the affected areas. At Anjar, a town in ruins, the RSS was present much before the Army and took the lead in finding survivors and fishing out the dead."

India Today, arguably India's most respected weekly, reported in its issue of 12 Feb 2001, that "It is conceded by even their worst detractors that the RSS through Seva Bharati has been in the forefront of the non-official rescue and relief (operations). This has led to an upsurge of goodwill for the Sangh".

Following the 2004 tsunami
When the 2004 tsunami hit the southern coasts of India, thousands of volunteers, under the aegis of the Seva Bharati, engaged in relief work. The volunteers, in cooperation with organisations like Ramakrishna Mutt in Tamil Nadu, Nair Service Society, Sri Narayana Guru Dharma Paripalana Yogam and Mata Amrithanandamayi Mutt in Kerala and Janakshema Samiti in Andhra Pradesh, set up relief camps in tsunami-affected districts of Tamil Nadu, Kerala, Andhra Pradesh, and Andaman and Nicobar Islands. They distributed thousands of food packets, organised teams doctors and cremated thousands of dead bodies.

Tughlaq, a magazine based in Chennai, carried a report on the relief work of the tsunami that hit the coasts of Tamil Nadu. It reported that when the tsunami left the whole government machinery paralysed, it was because of the immediate relief work of Seva Bharati that hundreds of lives were saved. "Seva Bharati had started rehabilitating people fleeing from the waves, losing their houses, boats, nets, etc., by feeding them, settling them in dry places, etc. during the first day itself. Medical relief was also made available in all the 208 places spread over nine districts." It further adds "The task of even taking the dead bodies to the medical centres appeared too daunting. It was the Seva Bharati workers who dared to venture into seashores and retrieve the bodies. From the beginning of the calamity on the morning of the 26th up to writing this on 2 January, the number of dead retrieved by Seva Bharati is 2,469! There have been occasions when some have been rescued alive while searching for bodies." The editor of Tughlaq, and noted dramatist Cho Ramaswamy says "The concerned authorities admit privately that it was the RSS-sponsored Seva Bharati, which did yeoman service everywhere. Politics forbids them to acknowledge this in public".

After the tsunami, Seva Bharati with other allied organisations conducted a survey of the affected areas and rehabilitated the people of the worst-hit villages and helped them build homes and other basic infrastructure facilities. It also conducted counseling sessions for the victims, mostly the children to help them face the trauma after the calamity.

During floods in South India (2009)
In the floods that swept across the Southern states of Karnataka and Andhra Pradesh.

In the first phase of relief operations, they distributed over 100 thousand food packets collected from neighboring villages and districts in the interior rural areas of Kurnool, Mahaboobnagar and Nalgonda districts. Since links to Kurnool had been cut off, material was brought in from Anantapur, Kadapa, Nellore in the Andhra Pradesh and Raichur in Karnataka. Relief camps were set up in Karnool town at Saraswati Sishu Mandir and G Pulla Reddy Engineering College. Volunteers from Adoni cleaned the Raghavendra Swamy temple in Mantralayam and cleared the carcasses of the cows of Goshala and other animals, and handed them over to the police.

In Hyderabad, 2,000 volunteers went round the city collecting money, food and other material needed for the flood-affected. Two donation collection centres have come up at the State headquarters of RSS and the Keshav Memorial School. Every day four truckloads of food material, two trucksloads of other essentials were dispatched to flood-affected areas. Besides, 200 volunteers from the city are engaged in sanitation work there.

In the second phase of relief operations, the RSS surveyed the affected areas of Mahaboobnagar district and found that 58 villages were badly destroyed and 16,000 families were devastated. The organisation decided to supply kits to 5,000 families to enable them to lead a normal life. Each kit consists of kitchen utensils, foodgrains and other material of daily use.

In Kurnool district, 250 to 300 villages were still underwater hampering their survey. In the third and final phase of operations, the RSS planned to rehabilitate devastated people and reconstruct destroyed villages.

"We have identified various means of rehabilitation of people like supplying them implements required for their occupation," volunteers said, adding that they were involving several voluntary organisations.

Following the 2013 Uttarakhand Floods
In the Floods and cloudburst that created havoc and mayhem in Uttarakhand, June 2013 Seva Bharathi had 5,000 RSS volunteers taken up relief and rescue along with the Indian Armed forces. The Largest ever rescue mission for the 100,000 pilgrims and locals.
From day 1 (16-June) till now 20 truckloads of relief material sent to flood-affected areas from Dehradun. RSS Sewa Vibhag surveying the area assessing the loss of life property. 1.Badrinath-Hemkund Sahib, 2. Kedarnath, 3. Gangotri-Yamunotri. Approx 200 villages are worst affected in the floods and some of them are totally washed out.

During floods in Chennai (2015)
Following the 2015 flood in Chennai, about 5900 Volunteers from Seva Bharati participated in rescue and relief work in flood-affected areas. According to a press note, the relief work was divided under 15 departments like medical, rescue, distribution of relief materials, counselling, preparing and distributing food (breakfast, lunch, and dinner), co-ordinating etc. i. Around 12,00,000 food packets were distributed. Medicines, dress materials and water were distributed. Seva Bharati volunteers also helped Indian Army in various rescue operations.

2018 Kerala floods
Seva bharathi participated in relief activity in 2018 Kerala floods.

Various relief camps were directly organized by Seva Bharati with the support of well-wishers and volunteers in which food, accommodation, and medical services were provided to the flood-affected people. 350 Sevabharathi units and 5,000 volunteers were engaged in the relief works in the flood-affected districts in the state. 350,000 food packets were distributed to the needy and 10 Blood donation camps were organised within a week.20 medical camps were conducted in Kuttalanadu regions in Alapuzha District, one of the most flood-affected areas in the state during flood times. 40 Ambulances of Sevabharathi were engaged in the flood relief work in different areas. Various relief camps were directly organized by Sevabharathi with the support of well-wishers and volunteers in which food, accommodation, and medical services are provided to the flood-affected people. Hundreds of common people were joining hands with Sevabharathi to support these initiatives and the organization was mobilizing cloths, food grains, drinking water bottles and other requirements from the public to serve the affected people. In each district, a collection center was opened to collect the materials from the public and to arrange the transportation to relief places. The state officials of Deseeya Sevabhrathi were directly monitoring the activities in each district.

Rehabilitating the victims of terrorism
Seva Bharati has adopted a hundred children from the insurgency and militancy affected regions of Jammu and Kashmir including Gul, Mohore, Dharmani and Buddhal Tehsils in Udhampur and Rajouri districts. The children, both Hindu and Muslim, who have been adopted have been rendered orphans by terrorist attacks in which many of the family members have been killed. The children are in the age group of five to fifteen. They will study till Class 12 in boarding schools in Delhi, which are funded or supported by the Seva Bharati.

The project by Seva Bharati hopes to give these children a life away from bloodshed and give them back their lost childhood and new dreams to chase. Their parents and guardians are happy that their children are in safe hands.

The Indian Army, which has selected the NGO for adoption, says that they are optimistic that these children after 10 years, will be some of the finest citizens of the country. The army sees a bright future for these children and believes that the humane gesture of NGOs like Seva Bharati and similar organisations from various parts of the country will go a long way in boosting the efforts to bring in an era of peace and prosperity in Jammu and Kashmir and more so root out the evil of terrorism from this region.

Other activities

Drinking water
It has several schemes that provide drinking water to the remote parts of India, mostly those facing water scarcity. Places that face severe water shortage are supplied water through the tankers at subsidized rates or for free. Free food distribution is also conducted in hospitals for ailing poor patients. It distributes warm clothing and sweaters for the under-privileged children to cope with the chilling winters.
Under the aegis of Seva Bharathi a water conservation forum Jala Bharathi has been started. Jala Bharathi organises seminar and training programs on water conservation and rainwater harvesting.

Environment awareness
The organisation conducts environment awareness programs among the general public. Such awareness campaigns have resulted in many environmental friendly steps being taken by the people. A pledge to shun environmentally hazardous disposable plastic items was taken by the residents of Jakkacombai Badaga hamlet in a remote part of Kotagiri a small village on the tip of Nilgiri hills.

Activities for senior citizens
Seva Bharati has daycare centre named 'Aasare' for the senior citizens who face constant neglect from their families and the society.

Volunteer activities
Seva Bharati serves as a platform for volunteers who help manage large community events. The volunteers have helped in crowd management, maintaining order and providing essential services to the pilgrims in centers that witness huge number of people like the Sabarimala temple in the South Indian state of Kerala. They set up medical camps and provide basic amenities such as drinking water. The organisations help is regularly sought by Governmental agencies in maintaining order during festivals. The organization organizes blood donation camps where volunteers and other youth are encouraged to donate blood.

References

External links 

Medical and health organisations based in India
Hindu organizations
Sangh Parivar
Hindutva
Organizations established in 1979